Mecyna cuprinalis is a moth in the family Crambidae. It was described by Ragonot in 1895. It is found in Lebanon and Turkey.

References

Moths described in 1895
Spilomelinae